The First Konoe Cabinet is the 34th Cabinet of Japan led by Fumimaro Konoe from June 4, 1937, to January 5, 1939.

Cabinet

Reshuffled Cabinet 
A Cabinet reshuffle took place on May 26, 1938.

References 

Cabinet of Japan
1937 establishments in Japan
Cabinets established in 1937
Cabinets disestablished in 1939